The Volunteer Arms  is a grade II listed building and working public house in Barton-upon-Humber, North Lincolnshire, England.

References

Grade II listed pubs in Lincolnshire
Grade II listed buildings in North Lincolnshire
Barton-upon-Humber
18th-century establishments in England